T. campanula may refer to:
 Tapeinosperma campanula, a plant species
 Trichuris campanula, a roundworm species

See also
 Campanula